Kukkarokivi is the largest glacially deposited rock in Turku, around Ruissalo.

According to Finnish folklore, the medieval church of Raisio was built by two giants called Killi and Nalli, however later the giants got into strife with the priest of the church. Because of the strife Killi later tried to destroy the church with a huge rock, this caused Killi to get lost and in his anger the giant threw the rock into Ruissalo.

See also 

 Nunnavuori
 Piispanristi
 Pallivahankivi

References 

Tourist attractions in Turku
Natura 2000 in Finland